Saint-Germain-Village is a former commune in the Eure department in Normandy in northern France. On 1 January 2018, it was merged into the commune of Pont-Audemer.

Population

See also
Communes of the Eure department

References

Former communes of Eure